Malini Rajurkar (born 8 January 1941) is a Hindustani classical singer of Gwalior Gharana.

Early life
She grew up in the state of Rajasthan in India. For three years she taught mathematics at the Savitri Girls’ High School & College, Ajmer, where she had graduated in the same subject. Taking advantage of a three-year scholarship that came her way, she finished her Sangeet Nipun from the Ajmer Music College, studying music under the guidance of Govindrao Rajurkar and his nephew, who was to become her future husband, Vasantrao Rajurkar.

Performing career
Malini has performed in major music festivals in India, including Gunidas Sammelan (Mumbai), Tansen Samaroh (Gwalior), Sawai Gandharva Festival (Pune), and Shankar Lal Festival (Delhi).

Malini is noted especially for her command over the Tappa and the Tarana genre. She has also sung lighter music. Her renditions of Marathi natyageete, pandu-nrupati janak jaya, naravar krishnasamaan, ya bhavanatil geet purane have been particularly popular.

Awards
 Sangeet Natak Academy Award 2001

References

External links
Blog on Malinitai's recitals

1941 births
Hindustani singers
Living people
Singers from Rajasthan
Gwalior gharana
Women Hindustani musicians
Indian women classical singers
20th-century Indian singers
20th-century Indian women singers
21st-century Indian women singers
21st-century Indian singers
Women musicians from Rajasthan
20th-century Khyal singers
Recipients of the Sangeet Natak Akademi Fellowship
Recipients of the Sangeet Natak Akademi Award